Anacostia is a historic neighborhood in Washington, D.C.

Anacostia may also refer to:

Places
 Anacostia Historic District, the historic district which encompasses the Anacostia neighborhood
 Anacostia station, a Washington Metro station in this neighborhood
 Naval Support Facility Anacostia, a formerly independent US Naval Base in this neighborhood, now part of the Joint Base Anacostia–Bolling
 Anacostia River, a river in the Mid Atlantic region of the US

Other
 Anacostia (web series), a soap opera web series set in the Washington, D.C. neighborhood
 Anacostia (moth), a genus of snout moths
 USS Anacostia (1856), a US Navy steamer
 USS Anacostia (AO-94), a US Navy replenishment oiler
 980 Anacostia, a minor planet orbiting the Sun
 Anacostia (band), U.S. soul band, previously recorded as The Presidents

See also
 District of Columbia Route 295, also called the Anacostia Freeway